Robeson County Agricultural Building is a historic government office building located at Lumberton, Robeson County, North Carolina. It was built in 1937 as a Works Progress Administration project.  It is a two-story, "T"-shaped Colonial Revival style brick building on a raised basement.

It was added to the National Register of Historic Places in 2012.

References

Works Progress Administration in North Carolina
Government buildings on the National Register of Historic Places in North Carolina
Colonial Revival architecture in North Carolina
Government buildings completed in 1937
Buildings and structures in Robeson County, North Carolina
National Register of Historic Places in Robeson County, North Carolina